Qurban Quli is a Turkic-derived Muslim male given name built from quli.

Gurbanguly Berdimuhamedow (born 1957), Turkmen politician
Gurbanguly Aşyrow (born 1993), Turkmen footballer

Turkic masculine given names